Estoloides venezuelensis is a species of beetle in the family Cerambycidae. It was described by Stephan von Breuning in 1942. It is known from Venezuela, from which its species epithet is derived.

References

Estoloides
Beetles described in 1942